The following is a list of United States senators and representatives who died of natural or accidental causes, or who killed themselves, while serving their terms between 1790 and 1899. For a list of members of Congress who were killed while in office, see List of United States Congress members killed or wounded in office.

See also 
 List of United States Congress members who died in office (1900–1949)
 List of United States Congress members who died in office (1950–1999)
 List of United States Congress members who died in office (2000–)

References

External links 
 Addresses for members of the U.S. Congress who died in the 1860s
 Addresses for members of the U.S. Congress who died in the 1870s
 Memorial Addresses for members of the U.S. Congress who died in the 1880s
 Memorial Addresses for members of the U.S. Congress who died in the 1890s

1790-1899